The West Division of the National Hockey League existed from 1967 until 1974 when the league realigned into two conferences of two divisions each. The division was reformed for the 2020–21 NHL season (and branded as the Honda West Division for sponsorship reasons) due to the COVID-19 pandemic.

In 1967 the NHL doubled in size, going from six teams to twelve. The Original Six, as the pre-1967 teams became retroactively known, were grouped into the East Division, while the expansion teams were placed into the West Division. This was done in order to keep teams of similar competitive strength in the same division, regardless of geographic distance, and to ensure playoff revenue for the new franchises.

When the NHL expanded again in 1970, the two new teams, the Vancouver Canucks and Buffalo Sabres, were placed into the stronger East Division. In an effort to create more balanced competition, the Chicago Black Hawks were transferred into the West Division. When the NHL expanded again in 1972, each division was given one of the expansion clubs, with the New York Islanders joining the East Division and the Atlanta Flames joining the West Division.

By 1974, another two teams (the Washington Capitals and Kansas City Scouts) entered the league, and the league underwent a major overhaul. The East and West Divisions were renamed the Prince of Wales and Clarence Campbell Conferences, respectively, composed of nine teams each. The conferences were further divided into two divisions: the Norris and Adams Divisions for the Wales Conference; the Patrick and Smythe Divisions for the Campbell Conference. Because the Conferences were not composed based on geography, the league opted to name the conferences and divisions after notable persons associated with the NHL.

The East and West Divisions were re-formed for the 2020–21 season as the result of the COVID-19 pandemic which forced the NHL to radically re-structure the League and to temporarily abolish the conferences. All eight West Division teams were members of the Western Conference in the 2019–20 season.

Division lineups

1967–1970
 Los Angeles Kings
 Minnesota North Stars
 Oakland Seals
 Philadelphia Flyers
 Pittsburgh Penguins
 St. Louis Blues

Changes from the 1966–67 season
 The West Division is formed as the result of NHL realignment
 All teams are added as expansion teams

1970–1972
 California Golden Seals
 Chicago Black Hawks
 Los Angeles Kings
 Minnesota North Stars
 Philadelphia Flyers
 Pittsburgh Penguins
 St. Louis Blues

Changes from the 1969–70 season
 The Oakland Seals change their name to the California Golden Seals
 The Chicago Black Hawks come from the East Division

1972–1974
 Atlanta Flames
 California Golden Seals
 Chicago Black Hawks
 Los Angeles Kings
 Minnesota North Stars
 Philadelphia Flyers
 Pittsburgh Penguins
 St. Louis Blues

Changes from the 1971–72 season
 The Atlanta Flames are added as an expansion team

After the 1973–74 season
The league was reformatted into two conferences with two divisions each. The California Golden Seals moved to the Adams Division. The Los Angeles Kings and Pittsburgh Penguins moved to the Norris Division. The Atlanta Flames and Philadelphia Flyers moved to the Patrick Division, while the Chicago Black Hawks, Minnesota North Stars, and St. Louis Blues moved to the Smythe Division.

2020–21
 Anaheim Ducks
 Arizona Coyotes
 Colorado Avalanche
 Los Angeles Kings
 Minnesota Wild
 San Jose Sharks
 St. Louis Blues
 Vegas Golden Knights

Changes from the 2019–20 season
 Due to COVID-19 restrictions the NHL realigned for the 2020–21 season
 The West Division is reformed for the 2020–21 NHL season
 The Anaheim Ducks, Arizona Coyotes, Los Angeles Kings, San Jose Sharks and Vegas Golden Knights come from the Pacific Division
 The Colorado Avalanche, Minnesota Wild and St. Louis Blues come from the Central Division

Changes from the 2020–21 season
 The division is dissolved as the league returned to previous two conference and four division alignment
 The Arizona Coyotes, Colorado Avalanche, Minnesota Wild and St. Louis Blues move to the Central Division
 The Anaheim Ducks, Los Angeles Kings, San Jose Sharks and Vegas Golden Knights move to the Pacific Division

Division champions
 1968 – Philadelphia Flyers (31–32–11, 73 pts)
 1969 – St. Louis Blues (37–25–14, 88 pts)
 1970 – St. Louis Blues (37–27–12, 86 pts)
 1971 – Chicago Black Hawks (49–20–9, 107 pts)
 1972 – Chicago Black Hawks (46–17–15, 107 pts)
 1973 – Chicago Black Hawks (42–27–9, 93 pts)
 1974 – Philadelphia Flyers (50–16–12, 112 pts)
 2021 – Colorado Avalanche (39–13–4, 82 pts)

Season results

Stanley Cup winners produced
 1974 – Philadelphia Flyers

Presidents' Trophy winners produced
 2021 – Colorado Avalanche

West Division titles won by team
Teams in bold were in the division in its most recent season.

References

 NHL History

National Hockey League divisions
Western Conference (NHL)